Nellis Historic District is a national historic district located at Nellis, Boone County, West Virginia. It encompasses 82 contributing buildings, three contributing structures, and one contributing object.  The district includes the commercial, ecclesiastical, and residential buildings built by the Nellis Coal Company as a planned community between 1920 and 1955.  The community was a model for coal communities in Boone County and the southern coal fields. Included in the district is the Nellis Church / Nellis Archives (1926), stone wall constructed by the Works Progress Administration (c. 1935), coal company storage building (c. 1945), Nellis Company Store and Offices (1922), community bulletin board (c. 1921), Superintendent's House (c. 1925), and clubhouse (c. 1925).

It was listed on the National Register of Historic Places in 2000.

References

National Register of Historic Places in Boone County, West Virginia
Historic districts in Boone County, West Virginia
Houses in Boone County, West Virginia
Houses on the National Register of Historic Places in West Virginia
Commercial buildings on the National Register of Historic Places in West Virginia
Historic districts on the National Register of Historic Places in West Virginia